"Funny Little World" is a song by Norwegian singer–songwriter Alexander Rybak from his debut studio album, Fairytales. It was released in Norway on May 13, 2009 by EMI Records as the second single from the album. "Funny Little World" was written by Alexander Rybak and produced by Henrik Wikström and Amir Aly.

"Funny Little World" received positive critical appreciation with most Norwegian critics. The song entered the Norwegian charts at #2 in its first week, only beaten by Rybak's own "Fairytale". "Funny Little World" was first released digitally as a Platekompaniet exclusive in Norway on May 13, Alexander Rybak's birthday. The song reached the top spot in its second week.

Alexander Rybak performed an acoustic version of the song for the first time at a press conference at the Eurovision Song Contest 2009 in Moscow, Russia.

Charts
When "Funny Little World" entered the Norwegian charts, it was the first time a Norwegian artist held both the first and second position in the singles chart. Technically, Kurt Nilsen managed to do this when he had his single on top, while his old band's re-release was at #2 in 2003. Otherwise, the closest was when Inger Lise Rypdal held the first and third positions in 1968.

Release history

References

2009 singles
Alexander Rybak songs
Number-one singles in Norway
2009 songs
EMI Records singles
Songs written by Alexander Rybak
Songs written by Henrik Wikström
Songs written by Amir Aly